The common name dwarf crab may refer to several different species:
Callinectes similis, the lesser blue crab
Rhithropanopeus harrisii

Animal common name disambiguation pages